The 2014 NCAA Division III women's basketball tournament was the 33rd annual tournament hosted by the NCAA to determine the national champion of Division III women's collegiate basketball in the United States.

Fairleigh Dickinson–Florham defeated Whitman in the championship game, 80–72, to claim the Devils' first Division III national title.

The championship rounds were hosted by the University of Wisconsin–Stevens Point at the Bennett Court at Quandt Fieldhouse in Stevens Point, Wisconsin.

Bracket

Final Four

All-tournament team
 Kyra Dayon, FDU Florham
 Jalessa Lewis, FDU Florham
 Kelsey Morehead, Tufts
 Mary Merg, Wisconsin–Whitewater
 Heather Johns, Whitman

See also
 2014 NCAA Division I women's basketball tournament
 2014 NCAA Division II women's basketball tournament
 2014 NAIA Division I women's basketball tournament
 2014 NAIA Division II women's basketball tournament
 2014 NCAA Division III men's basketball tournament

References

 
NCAA Division III women's basketball tournament
2014 in sports in Wisconsin
Fairleigh Dickinson–Florham Devils
Whitman Blues